Ibrāhīm ibn Muhammad ibn Ahmad al-Bājūrī was an Egyptian-Ottoman scholar, theologian and a dean of the al-Azhar University. A follower of Imam Al-Shafiʽi, he authored over 20 works and commentaries in sacred law, tenets of faith, Islamic estate division, scholastic theology, logic and Arabic.

Birth and Education 
al-Bajuri was born in the village of El Bagour, Monufia Governorate of Egypt. He was raised and educated initially by his father, studying the Qur'an and its recitation. At the age of 14 al-Bajuri entered al-Azhar in order to study the traditional sciences of Islam. In 1798, al-Bajuri left al-Azhar due to the invasion of the French, and went to Giza where he remained until 1801; he then returned to al-Azhar to complete his education. Here, he excelled in his studies and began to teach and write on a variety of topics.

Rector of al-Azhar University 
al-Bajuri taught at al-Azhar University, and in 1847 became its rector, a position he held until the end of his life. During his tenure as Shaykh al-Azhar he spent much of his time teaching. His students included both young students aspiring to scholarship and also many of the great scholars of al-Azhar.

Works 
The most popular works in al-Bajuri's extensive literary production are:

 Risala fi i'lm al-Tawhid
 al-Mawahib al-Laduniyya, a commentary on the Kitab al-Shama'il of al-Tirmidhi
 a commentary on the Burda of al-Busiri
 a commentary on the Takhrib or Mukhtasar of Abu Shuja (Matn Abi Shuja) 
 a commentary on the Akida al-Sughra of al-Sanusi
 a gloss on a commentary on the Jawharat al-Tawhid of Ibrahim ibn Ibrahim al-Lakani 
 a gloss on al-Akhdari's commentary on his own al-Sullam al-Murawnak
 a commentary on the Kifayat al-Awamm of his teacher al-Fadali
 a commentary on the Mawlid of al-Dardir
 a commentary on a versification of the Ajārūmīya of Ibn Adjurrum.

Death 
al-Bajuri died in 1276/1860.

See also 
 List of Ash'aris and Maturidis

References 

Shafi'is
Asharis
1784 births
1860 deaths
People from Monufia Governorate
Egyptian Sunni Muslims
19th-century Muslim theologians